Charles Joseph may refer to:

 Charles Joseph (musician), jazz trombone player from New Orleans
 Charles Joseph (athlete) (born 1952), retired athlete from Trinidad and Tobago
 Charles Joseph, comte Bresson (1798–1847), French diplomat
 Charles Joseph, comte de Flahaut (1785–1870), French general and statesman
 Charles Joseph of Lorraine (1680–1715), German prelate
 Charles-Joseph, 7th Prince of Ligne (1735–1814), field marshal and writer

See also